The 1960 Armstrong 500 was an endurance motor race for Australian made or assembled standard production sedans. The event was held at the Phillip Island Grand Prix Circuit in Victoria, Australia on 20 November 1960 over 167 laps of the 3.0 mile circuit, a total distance of 501 miles.

The race was organised by the Light Car Club of Australia and promoted by Armstrong York Engineering Pty Ltd. Jim Thompson, managing director of the shock absorber manufacturer, was encouraged by his PR man Ron Thonemann to increase the company's business with major carmakers, particularly Ford and Holden, by sponsoring a race.

This was the first event held in the history of the race later to become known as the Bathurst 1000, the race that would come to dominate Australian motor racing.

Outright controversy
Officially only class placings and prize money were awarded, with no outright winner recognised. In later years as the fame of the Bathurst 1000 grew, outright placings, particularly the outright winner, became more widely recognised. John Roxburgh and Frank Coad have been widely acclaimed as the outright winners of the event, and have been recognised in CAMS motorsport manual in more recent times. This has been the source of some controversy as claims the winners of Class C, Geoff Russell, David Anderson and Tony Loxton covered the race distance in a faster time. The source of the discrepancy arises from the starting procedure which saw the classes released at ten second intervals, with the Class D Roxburgh/Coad Vauxhall starting the race ten seconds before the Class C Russell/Anderson/Loxton Peugeot. A comprehensive investigation in 1992 by Graham Hoinville, utilizing the record of individual lap times from the race, concluded that the car of Frank Coad and John Roxburgh was the first to finish the race.

Class structure

Class A
Class A was for cars with an engine capacity of 750cc or less. The class featured Fiat 600, Lloyd Alexander, NSU Prinz and Renault 750

Class B
Class B was for cars with an engine capacity of between 751cc and 1300cc. The class featured Ford Anglia, Renault Dauphine, Simca Aronde, Triumph Herald and Volkswagen Beetle

Class C

Class C was for cars with an engine capacity of between 1301cc and 2000cc. The class featured Austin Lancer, Hillman Minx, Morris Major, Peugeot 403 and Singer Gazelle.

Class D
Class D was for cars with an engine capacity between 2001cc and 3500cc. The class featured Ford Falcon, Humber Super Snipe, Mercedes-Benz 220SE, Standard Vanguard, Vauxhall Cresta.

Class E
Class E was for cars with an engine capacity over 3500cc. There was only one entry in the class, a Ford Customline.

Results
Class results were as follows:

Statistics
 Fastest Lap - #47 Youl/Youl - 2:41 - Laps 15, 45 & 62
 Race Time of Car No. 37 : 8:20:45

References

A History of Australian Motor Sport, © 1980
Australian Motor Sport, Dec 1960 - Jan 1961
 
Australia's Greatest Motor Race, 1960–1989
The Age, Monday, 21 Nov 1960
The Book Of Australian Motor Racing, © 1964

External links
 race results
 Autopics Phillip Island images
 National Motor Racing Museum

Armstrong 500
Armstrong 500
Motorsport at Phillip Island